Events in the year 1884 in Portugal.

Incumbents
Monarch: Luís I 
President of the Council of Ministers: Fontes Pereira de Melo

Events
 11 May - Establishment of the Museu Nacional de Belas-Artes e Arqueologia.
 29 June - Legislative election
 Opening of the Lisbon Zoo.
 Launch of NRP Afonso de Albuquerque.

Births

 22 January - Artur Santos, journalist, local politician (died 1955)
 10 May - Raul Proença, writer, journalist, intellectual (died 1941)
 24 August - Joaquim Vital, wrestler (deceased)

Deaths
 5 February - Infanta Maria Anna of Portugal, infanta (born 1843)
 20 March - Henrique Pousão, painter (born 1859)
 26 May - Joaquim António de Aguiar, politician (born 1792)
 13 November - José Rodrigues Maio, hero, lifeguard, fisherman (born 1817)
 João Anastácio Rosa, actor, sculptor (born 1812)

See also
List of colonial governors in 1884#Portugal

References

 
Years of the 19th century in Portugal
Portugal